Argada Area is one of the operational areas of the Central Coalfields Limited located in the  Ramgarh and Hazaribagh districts in the state of Jharkhand, India.

The projects of the Argada Area are: Gidi A Open Cast, Gidi C opencast, Religara opencast/ underground, Sirka opencast, Sirka underground, Argada underground, Giddi Washery. The area office is at Sirka, PO Argada 829101.

Mining activity

Mines and projects

Gidi is an old colliery that started functioning in 1958. Several seams (Argada, Argada-A, Argada-B, Sirka, Bansgarha, Hatidhari and upper & lower Semana) have been worked by underground mining methods, either through independent mine entries / inclines or drifts from one seam to another. In addition, the mine has been worked by opencast methods in six patches (Quarries 1, 2, 3, 4, 5 and 6). Giddi-A open cast project is located in the east central part of South Karanpura Coalfield. All the underground workings of Giddi-A colliery were stopped since March 1984. Presently the mine operation is limited to opencast working in Quarry no. 3.

The Pre-Feasibility Report for working in Giddi-A colliery covers the area of existing working in Quarry nos. 2 and 3 of Giddi-A along with a new patch transferred from Religara Colliery in an adjacent location north east of Quarry no. 3. Two working sections have been envisaged in this scheme – the western section being an existing working section and the eastern section is a green field area. The combined mineable reserve of both the sections is 3.70 million tonnes. The estimated life of the eastern section is 6 years and the western section is 3 years.

The Sirka opencast project is located in the eastern part of the South Karanpura Coalfield. It was earlier owned by Bird & Company and was taken over at the time of nationalisation in 1973. At that time it produced 0.30-0.35 million tonnes per year, using both underground and opencast methods. As of 2012–13, Sirka project was operating in Argada Area with an annual capacity of 0.25 million tonnes per year of raw coal. Sirka is a census town in Ramgarh (community development block) in Ramgarh district. 

The Argada underground project is located in the eastern part of the South Karanpura Coalfield. It was earlier owned by Bird & Company and was taken over at the time of nationalisation in 1973. At that time, it produced 0.35 million tonnes per year, using underground methods. Argada underground project has a production capacity of 0.06 million tonnes per year. The Damodar flows along its western and southern boundaries. It is about 10 km from Ramgarh Cantonment.

Gidi Non-Coking Coal Washery was set up in 1975 with an installed capacity of 2.5 million tonnes per year. According to a newspaper report Gidi Washery was closed in October 2020.

Note: For Hazaribagh district map see Barka Sayal Area

Illegal mining activities
According to the Report on Prevention of Illegal Coal Mining and Theft, “The main source of illegal mining of coal and theft is abandoned mines. After economic extraction is over, the remaining coal in an abandoned mine is stolen by coal mafias, villagers leading to roof falling, water flooding, poisonous gas leaking, leading to the death of many labourers.”In the Argada Area of CCL illegal mining activities are taking place in Argada B&J Incline, Sirka Quarry 1& 2, Gidi 1, 5, 2. Illegal mining also takes place in the fringe areas and outside the leasehold areas of CCL.

Educational facilities for employees’ children
Central Coalfields Limited provides support for reputed institutions/ trusts for setting up 10+2 pattern CBSE schools for children of CCL employees. It provides 109 buses to employees’ children to schools and back. Among the schools in the South Karanpura Coalfield that receive financial help or structural support are: DAV Urimari, DAV Gidi.

Medical facilities
In the South Karanpura Coalfield, CCL has the following facilities:

AKC Bhurkunda (Hospital) at Bhurkunda with 35 beds has 4 general duty medical officers and 1 specialist. Among the facilities it has are: X‐ray machine, ECG machine, nebulizer, patho lab. It has 2 ambulances.

Central Saunda Hospital at Saunda has 15 beds.

ARH Sayal at Sayal with 20 beds has 1 general duty medical officer. Among the facilities it has are: X‐Ray machine, patho lab. It has 2 ambulances.

There are central facilities in the Central Hospital, Gandhinagar at Kanke Road, Ranchi with 250 beds and in the Central Hospital, Naisarai at Ramgarh with 150 beds.

AKC, Gidi A at Gidi with 31 beds has 6 general duty medical officer and 1 specialist. Among the medical facilities it has is: X-ray machine. It has 3 ambulances.

There are dispensaries at Sirka and Gidi C in the Argada Area, and at Urimari in the Barka Sayal Area.

References

Coal mining operational areas in Jharkhand